Europus or Europos was a town of Almopia in ancient Macedonia.

The site of Europus is located near modern Chrisi (Chryse).

References

Populated places in ancient Macedonia
Former populated places in Greece